Vadakannikaapuram is a railway station on the  Palakkad–Pollachi line which is a branch line between Palakkad and Pollachi in the state of Kerala, India.

History
The line was functioning completely between Palakkad Junction and Palakkad Town. The section of the line between Palakkad Town and Pollachi completed safety testing on 2 October 2015. The safety inspection that followed conversion of the track was completed on 7 October 2015. The line was approved for passenger train services by the Commissioner of Railway Safety on 8 October 2015.

References

Palakkad–Pollachi line
Railway stations in Coimbatore district
Palakkad railway division